Dead arm syndrome starts with repetitive motion and forces on the posterior capsule of the shoulder. The posterior capsule is a band of fibrous tissue that interconnects with tendons of the rotator cuff of the shoulder. Four muscles and their tendons make up the rotator cuff. They cover the outside of the shoulder to hold, protect and move the joint.

Overuse can lead to a buildup of tissue around the posterior capsule called hypertrophy. The next step is tightness of the posterior capsule called posterior capsular contracture. This type of problem reduces the amount the shoulder can rotate inwardly.

Over time, with enough force, a tear may develop in the labrum. The labrum is a rim of cartilage around the shoulder socket to help hold the head of the humerus (upper arm) in the joint. This condition is called a superior labrum anterior posterior (SLAP) lesion. The outcome in all these steps is the dead arm phenomenon.

The shoulder is unstable and dislocation may come next. Dead arm syndrome will not go away on its own with rest—it must be treated. If there is a SLAP lesion, then surgery is needed to repair the problem. If the injury is caught before a SLAP tear, then physical therapy with stretching and exercise can restore it.

It is common among baseball pitchers as they age, and it can also occur with quarterbacks in football and handball players also as they age.

References

Musculoskeletal disorders
Syndromes